K-1 World Grand Prix 2006 in Tokyo Final was a kickboxing promoted by the K-1 ortheminutes each, with a possible tiebreaker.

The tournament qualifiers had all qualified via elimination fights at the K-1 World Grand Prix 2006 in Osaka Opening Round.  Losing fighters Musashi and Ray Sefo were invited as reserve fighters while Badr Hari and Paul Slowinski would face one another in a 'Super Fight'.  Peter Aerts and Melvin Manhoef were also invited to the event as reservists.  As well as tournament bouts there were also a number of 'Opening Fights' primarily involving local fighters, fought under K-1 Rules.  In total there were eighteen fighters at the event, representing ten countries.

The tournament winner was Semmy Schilt who won his second consecutive K-1 World Grand Prix by defeating Peter Aerts (who was making his fourth appearance in the final) via third round unanimous decision.  The victory was sweet revenge for Schilt who had lost to Aerts earlier on in the year at the K-1 World Grand Prix 2006 in Auckland.  The event was also notable for being Ernesto Hoost's last K-1 tournament and last fight - after a career spanning twenty-three years featuring numerous titles including four K-1 World Grand Prix victories.  Hoost managed to make the semi finals where he was defeated via third round unanimous decision by the eventual winner Schilt.  The event was held at the Tokyo Dome in Tokyo, Japan on Saturday, December 2, 2006 in front of 54,800 spectators.

K-1 World Grand Prix 2006 Tournament

* Remy Bonjasky was unable to continue due to injury - his place in the Semi Finals was taken by Reserve Fight winner Peter Aerts.

Results

Opening Fights: K-1 Rules / 3Min. 3R Ext.1R
Takumi Sato  vs Tsutomu Takahagi 
Sato defeated Takahagi by KO at 2:47 of the 2nd Round.

Mitsugu Noda  vs Junichi Sawayashiki 
Sawayashiki defeated Noda by 3rd Round Split Decision 2-1 (28-29, 30-29, 30-28).

Hiraku Hori  vs Kyoung-suk Kim  
Hori defeated Kim by 3rd Round Unanimous Decision 3-0 (29-28, 29-28, 29-28).

Reserve Fight #1: K-1 Rules / 3Min. 3R Ext.1R
Peter Aerts  vs Musashi  
Aerts defeated Musashi by KO (Punches) at 2:53 of the 1st Round.

Quarter Finals: K-1 Rules / 3Min. 3R Ext.1R
Jérôme Le Banner  vs Semmy Schilt 
Schilt defeated Le Banner by 3rd Round Unanimous Decision 3-0 (30-27, 30-28, 30-28).

Chalid Arrab  vs Ernesto Hoost 
Hoost defeated Arrab by Extra Round Unanimous Decision 3-0 (10-9, 10-9, 10-9).  After 3 rounds the judges had scored it a Majority Draw 1-0 (30-30, 30-28, 30-30) in favour of Hoost.

Glaube Feitosa  vs Ruslan Karaev 
Feitosa defeated Karaev by KO (Brazilian High Kick) at 1:11 of the 1st Round.

Remy Bonjasky  vs Stefan Leko    
Bonjasky defeated Leko by 3rd Round Unanimous Decision 3-0 (30-28, 30-28, 30-28). After suffering two kicks to the groin, Bonjasky was not able to recover in the time allowed.  K-1 officials decided to postpone the bout until later in the evening, giving Bonjasky time to recompose.  The bout was completed after the first Superfight of the card.

Reserve Fight #2: K-1 Rules / 3Min. 3R Ext.1R
Melvin Manhoef  vs Ray Sefo 
Sefo defeated Manhoef by KO (Right Hook) at 0:40 of the 1st Round.

Semi Finals: K-1 Rules / 3Min. 3R Ext.1R
Semmy Schilt  vs Ernesto Hoost 
Schilt defeated Hoost by 3rd Round Unanimous Decision 3-0 (30-28, 30-27, 30-27).

Glaube Feitosa  vs Peter Aerts  
Aerts defeated Feitosa by TKO (Referee Stoppage) at 1:02 of the 2nd Round. Due to a groin injury Remy Bonjasky was forced to withdraw from the tournament and was replaced by the first reserve fight winner, Peter Aerts.

Super Fight: K-1 Rules / 3Min. 3R Ext.1R
Badr Hari  vs Paul Slowinski  
Hari defeated Slowinski by 3rd Round Unanimous Decision 3-0 (30-27, 30-27, 30-29).

Final: K-1 Rules / 3Min. 3R Ext.2R
Semmy Schilt  vs Peter Aerts 
Schilt defeated Aerts by 3rd Round Unanimous Decision 3-0 (30-27, 30-27, 30-28).

See also
List of K-1 events
List of male kickboxers

References

External links
K-1sport.de - Your Source for Everything K-1
K-1 Official Website

K-1 events
2006 in kickboxing
Kickboxing in Japan
Sports competitions in Tokyo